Flayat is a commune in the Creuse department in the Nouvelle-Aquitaine region in central France.

Geography
The commune has an eastern border with the department of Allier and is within the national park of the Millevaches (not 1000 cows, but lakes).

The Chavanon (locally called la Ramade) forms most of the commune's eastern border.

Population

Sights
 The sixteenth-century church of St. Martin.
 The chapel of Salesses, dating from the thirteenth century.
 The chapel of St. Clair, from the eighteenth century.
 A chateau.

See also
Communes of the Creuse department

References

Communes of Creuse